Yeardley (also: Yeardlea, Yeardlee, Yeardleigh, Yeardlie, or Yardley) is a given name and a surname. The name means "enclosed meadow" but could also mean a bullying and poisonous cow. As a given name, it is predominantly a male's name but may also be a female's name.

Notable people with the given name Yeardley include voice actress Yeardley Smith and lacrosse player and murder victim Yeardley Love. Nicknames given to Yeardley are "Lee" and "Yard".

A notable person with the surname Yeardley is George Yeardley (1587–1627), plantation owner and Governor of Virginia.

List

Given name "Yeardley"
 Yeardley Love (1987–2010), Virginia murder victim
 Yeardley Smith (Martha Maria Yeardley Smith) (born 1964), actress, stars on The Simpsons

Surname "Yeardley"
 Temperance Flowerdew Yeardley (1590–1628), wife of governor George Yeardley
 George Yeardley (1587–1627), governor of British Virginia
 John Yeardley (1786–1858), Quaker missionary

See also
 
 
 
 
 
 
 Yardley

References